Björn Joppe (born 13 December 1978) is a German former professional football player and manager. He is currently the manager of KFC Uerdingen 05.

Career
Jpppe was born in Wuppertal. He spent two seasons in the Bundesliga with VfL Bochum.

Coaching career
In summer 2009, was named as manager of the C-Youth team of the club Sportfreunde Schwäbisch Hall.

In December 2022 he became new manager of KFC Uerdingen 05.

References

External links

Björn Joppe on Fupa

1978 births
Living people
Sportspeople from Wuppertal
Association football midfielders
German footballers
Wuppertaler SV players
VfL Bochum players
VfL Bochum II players
1. FC Union Berlin players
VfL Osnabrück players
VfR Aalen players
SSVg Velbert players
Bundesliga players
2. Bundesliga players
German football managers
Footballers from North Rhine-Westphalia
1. FC Lokomotive Leipzig managers
Bonner SC managers
KFC Uerdingen 05 managers